Surf's Up may refer to:
Surf's Up! At Banzai Pipeline, a 1963 various artists album
Surf's Up (album), a 1971 album by The Beach Boys
"Surf's Up" (song), the album's title track
Surf's Up (film), a 2007 computer-animated film
Surf's Up (video game), a video game based on the 2007 film
"Surf's Up", a 1981 song by Jim Steinman, sung in 1984 by Meat Loaf
Surf's Up! (album), the second album by David Thomas and Two Pale Boys
"Surf's Up!", a 1995 single by Warren DeMartini
Surf's Up, a 2003 book by Jim Toomey

See also
Surfing
Surf culture